Based in Burlington, Ontario, TransUnion Canada is one of two credit reporting agencies in Canada. Like their main competitor, Equifax Canada, they now market their credit reports directly to consumers, in addition to their core business of providing the reports to potential creditors.

Services
Services offered by TransUnion Canada include:

 Disputes    
 Fraud   
 General   
 Score
 Consumer disclosures

Legal
Consumer Protection B.C issued a compliance order against Trans Union to remove all data it held over 6 years. Trans Union refused to comply with the compliance order as felt obligated to report "substantiated facts", longer than six years. TransUnion requested a review of the compliance order, which led to court action. The BC Supreme Court ruled that the compliance order was lawful.

See also
Identity theft
TransUnion
Equifax Canada

References

External links
TransUnion Canada

Financial services companies of Canada
Banking in Canada